Matchstick puzzles are rearrangement puzzles in which a number of matchsticks are arranged as squares, rectangles or triangles. The problem to solve is usually formulated as: "move n matchsticks to make m squares, triangles, or rectangles". Some match stick problems are solved with planar topological graphs.

Other matchstick puzzles require lateral thinking and are not just about making geometric shapes.

Different three-dimensional matchstick arrangements are also possible as puzzles held together with friction.

References 

Puzzles